All the Time in the World is the second studio album from Christian pop group Jump5. "All I Can Do" was released as a Radio Disney single, while the "Joyride" and "Forever in My Heart" singles were later released for both Christian contemporary hit radio (CHR) and adult contemporary radio. "Angel in My Heart" is a cover of a Hear'Say song from their Everybody album.

Track listing

Reception 
The album peaked at No. 3 on the Billboard Contemporary Christian Album Charts, and No. 86 on the Billboard 200.

A DVD acting as a companion for the album was released on August 13, 2002, the same date as the album. It included the music video for "All I Can Do," a live performance of "Start Jumpin'" on Go for It! TV, and a behind the scenes featurette about the making of the "Beauty and the Beast" music video, as well the Disney song appeared in Disneymania as exclusive interviews.

Promotion and features 

Jump5's "All I Can Do" was re-recorded to promote a hidden commercial with JCPenney "It's All Inside". And the hits of their own songs were to appear in Radio Disney's promotion with McDonald's Mighty Music CD & Radio Disney Jams Vol. 6 and the Lizzie McGuire soundtrack.

References 

2002 albums
Jump5 albums
Sparrow Records albums